Nepenthes × tsangoya (after Peter Tsang) is a tropical pitcher plant. It reportedly represents the complex natural hybrid (N. alata × N. merrilliana) × N. mirabilis.

Nepenthes × tsangoya was mentioned as a natural hybrid in Guide to Nepenthes Hybrids (1995).  The known ranges of the parent species only overlap in Mindanao, the Philippines.

References

CP Database: Nepenthes × tsangoya

Carnivorous plants of Asia
tsangoya
Nomina nuda
Flora of Mindanao